Isao Torada may refer to 
Isao Torada, a pen name used by Yūji Yamaguchi as director of AM Driver
Isao Torada, a character in Daitokai Series